An Omnibus Customer Securities Account is a securities account used by a brokerage firm or its affiliated clearing firm in order to maintain appropriate custody of underlying securities for the purpose of satisfying the custody obligations of the broker-dealer towards its customers.

Article 8 of the Uniform Commercial Code provides for a standard settlement procedure for securities transfers to be effected by book entry when the underlying securities are registered in the name of the designated nominee of a securities intermediary. Article 8 also provides for multiple book-entry systems to act together to form a heavily-intermediated securities holding chain known as an Indirect holding system.

The term "Omnibus Account" is used by Federal Securities Regulations, such as the SEC's Customer Protection Rule, which makes it a violation of federal regulations for a broker-dealer to fail to maintain an adequate number of securities to match the sum of fully paid securities entitlements the brokerage firm has issued to its customers.

References

Securities (finance)